The 2015-16 Pioneers represented Sacred Heart University as a Division I independent team during the 2015-16 NCAA Division I women's ice hockey season.

Roster

2015–16 Pioneers

Schedule

|-
!colspan=12 style=""| Regular Season

|-
!colspan=12 style=""| NEHC Open

References

Sacred Heart
Sacred Heart Pioneers women's ice hockey seasons
Sacred Heart Pioneers
Sacred Heart Pioneers